Compsoctenus is a genus of click beetles. It contains the sole species Compsoctenus elegans, found in Chile.

References

External links 

 
 Compsoctenus at insectoid.info

Elateridae genera
Monotypic Elateriformia genera
Endemic fauna of Chile